A swordfish is a type of large fish.

Swordfish may also refer to:

Military
 Fairey Swordfish, a British carrier-based biplane torpedo bomber
 HMS Swordfish, the name of three British warships
 Swordfish, a 1962 U.S. Operation Dominic I and II nuclear test explosion
 Swordfish class destroyer, a class of two Royal Navy destroyers
 Swordfish Long Range Tracking Radar, used by India for ballistic missile defense
 USS Swordfish, the name of two submarines in the United States Navy
 Zwaardvis class submarine (Dutch for swordfish), a Royal Netherlands Navy class of conventional attack submarines

Other uses
 Swordfish (clipper), an 1851 ship designed by William H. Webb
 Swordfish (film), a 2001 action thriller directed by Dominic Sena
 Swordfish (soundtrack), a soundtrack album from the film
 Swordfish (Merk album), 2016
 Swordfish Studios, a video game developer
 Swordfish Translation Editor, a translation tool based on XLIFF standard
 "Swordfish", a song by the Dead Milkmen from Big Lizard in My Backyard
 Swordfish, a sudoku technique